Masein (Romansh: Masagn) is a municipality in the Viamala Region in the Swiss canton of Graubünden.

History
Masein is first mentioned in 1156 as de Medezenu.

Geography
Of this area, 38.4% is used for agricultural purposes, while 52% is forested. Of the rest of the land, 6% is settled (buildings or roads) and the remainder (3.6%) is non-productive (rivers, glaciers or mountains).

Before 2017, the municipality was located in the Thusis sub-district, of the Hinterrhein district, after 2017 it was part of the Viamala Region.  It is located on the lower Heinzenberg and consists of the two settlements of Ober- and Unter-Masein and the hamlets of Dalaus, Cresta und Lochmüli.

Demographics
, 2.8% of the population was made up of foreign nationals. Over the last 10 years the population has grown at a rate of 2.9%.

, the gender distribution of the population was 51.0% male and 49.0% female.  The age distribution, in Masein is; 46 people or 12.6% of the population are between 0 and 9 years old.  29 people or 7.9% are 10 to 14, and 37 people or 10.1% are 15 to 19.  Of the adult population, 38 people or 10.4% of the population are between 20 and 29 years old.  60 people or 16.4% are 30 to 39, 70 people or 19.1% are 40 to 49, and 47 people or 12.8% are 50 to 59.  The senior population distribution is 21 people or 5.7% of the population are between 60 and 69 years old, 12 people or 3.3% are 70 to 79, there are 5 people or 1.4% who are 80 to 89, and there is 1 person who is 90 to 99.

In the 2007 federal election the most popular party was the SVP which received 37.7% of the vote.  The next three most popular parties were the SPS (33.6%), the FDP (14.8%) and the CVP (11.4%).

The entire Swiss population is generally well educated.  In Masein about 80.4% of the population (between age 25-64) have completed either non-mandatory upper secondary education or additional higher education (either university or a Fachhochschule).

Masein has an unemployment rate of 1.21%.  , there were 32 people employed in the primary economic sector and about 11 businesses involved in this sector.  3 people are employed in the secondary sector and there are 2 businesses in this sector.  47 people are employed in the tertiary sector, with 11 businesses in this sector.

The historical population is given in the following table:

Languages
Most of the population speaks German (92.6%), with Romansh being second most common ( 3.3%) and Dutch being third ( 1.4%).

References

External links
 Official Web site

Municipalities of Graubünden